Alex Joseph Pritchard (born 5 November 1994) is a British dancer and choreographer. In 2013, he auditioned for the seventh series of Britain's Got Talent along with professional partner Chloe Hewitt, where they reached the semi-finals. From 2016 to 2019, Pritchard appeared as a professional dancer on the BBC One dance series Strictly Come Dancing. In 2020, he participated in the twentieth series of I'm a Celebrity...Get Me Out of Here!

Early life
Pritchard was born on 5 November 1994 in Sneyd Green, Stoke-on-Trent. He began dancing at the age of 12, and his parents partnered him with Chloe Hewitt from their dance school. He has a younger brother, Curtis, a fellow dance professional, who appears on Dancing with the Stars in Ireland.

Career
In 2013, Pritchard and his professional dance partner Hewitt auditioned for Britain's Got Talent; the pair eventually reached the live semi-finals. In September 2018, Pritchard took part in BBC's Celebrity MasterChef leaving the show after his apple crumble infuriated the judges.

In October 2018, he partnered with Louis Smith in the celebrity version of Hunted, in aid of Stand Up to Cancer. In July 2019, it was announced that Pritchard, along with his brother Curtis, would appear as guest choreographers on the BBC Three reality series RuPaul's Drag Race UK. In November 2020, it was announced that Pritchard would be contestant on the twentieth series of I'm a Celebrity...Get Me Out of Here. He became the seventh celebrity to be eliminated alongside Mo Farah on 2 December. In February 2021, it was announced that Pritchard would be making his acting debut in the Channel 4 soap opera Hollyoaks, alongside his brother. He portrayed the role of Marco; their acting abilities were the subject of widespread criticism.

Pritchard was one of four finalists who completed series 4 of Celebrity SAS: Who Dares Wins.

In 2023, Pritchard competed on the reality-competition series The Challenge UK.

Strictly Come Dancing
In 2016, Pritchard appeared as a professional in the BBC dance show, Strictly Come Dancing for its fourteenth series. He was partnered with Olympic artistic gymnast Claudia Fragapane. They were eliminated in the semi-finals on 11 December 2016, finishing in 4th place overall. In his first series, Pritchard received praise for his innovative choreography.

Pritchard returned to Strictly the following year for his second series, and was partnered with Mollie King, a singer and former member of girl group The Saturdays. The pair made it to week 12, being knocked out at the semi-final stage and finishing in 5th place overall. In his third series in 2018, he was partnered with British Paralympic athlete Lauren Steadman. They were eliminated at the semi-final stage, finishing in 5th place, in Pritchard's third consecutive semi-final elimination.

In March 2019, Pritchard was confirmed to be returning to Strictly for his fourth series. In September 2019. it was revealed that he would partner vlogger Saffron Barker. They were eliminated on week 10, making this the first and only series where Pritchard failed to reach the semi-final. Despite being confirmed in the 2020 professional line-up, on 26 March 2020, Pritchard announced that he was leaving the show in order to pursue a career in presenting.

Highest and Lowest Scoring Per Dance

Claudia Fragapane
He partnered Olympic artistic gymnast Claudia Fragapane for the fourteenth season of Strictly Come Dancing.

Mollie King
For the fifteenth season of Strictly Come Dancing he partnered English singer-songwriter, presenter and model Mollie King.

Lauren Steadman
He partnered British Paralympic athlete Lauren Steadman for the sixteenth season of Strictly Come Dancing.

Score was awarded by guest judge Alfonso Ribeiro

Saffron Barker 
He partnered television presenter YouTube personality and author Saffron Barker for the seventeenth season of Strictly Come Dancing. They were eliminated in week 10, coming sixth.

Score was awarded by guest judge Alfonso Ribeiro

Personal life 
Pritchard has OCD and dyslexia and is colour blind. On 27 December 2018, Pritchard and his brother Curtis, along with two others, were attacked in an "unprovoked assault" on a night out in Nantwich. Pritchard suffered bruising to his face, arms, legs and body.

In 2018 Pritchard was featured in a photo-shoot in the October issue of gay magazine Attitude.

References

1994 births
Living people
British ballroom dancers
People from Sneyd Green
Britain's Got Talent contestants
I'm a Celebrity...Get Me Out of Here! (British TV series) participants
The Challenge (TV series) contestants